The 1925 North Dakota Flickertails football team, also known as the Nodaks, was an American football team that represented University of North Dakota in North Central Conference (NCC) during the 1925 college football season. In its seventh and final season under head coach Paul J. Davis, the team compiled a 4–4 record (2–2 against NCC opponents), tied for fourth place in the NCC, and outscored opponents by a total of 165 to 77.

North Dakota end Geston was selected as a first-team player on the 1925 All-North Central Conference football team.

Schedule

References

North Dakota
North Dakota Fighting Hawks football seasons
North Dakota Flickertails football